was a Japanese professional footballer who played as a goalkeeper.

Club career
Takada started his goalkeeper career in Japan, then England, Ireland, Norway, Germany, Australia, Hong Kong, Indonesia. He then ended his professional career in Hong Kong.

Rangers
Takada signed for Hong Kong Rangers in 2007.

Persitara
In 2010, Takada played for Persitara in the Indonesia Super League before returning to Japan.

Pegasus
Takada finished his three-month contract with Persitara and then became a free agent. He returned to Hong Kong to train with Citizen. He went to the 2010–11 Hong Kong Senior Challenge Shield final, then uploaded a match video to YouTube and telling people that he was looking for a club on facebook. In the end he joined Pegasus in the summer of 2011.

Advertising
Takada appeared in Hongkong Post's advertising campaign. He said it was a part-time job he found during the summer break.

References

External links
 Official Site
 Official player profile on TSW Pegasus FC website

1981 births
2022 deaths
Sportspeople from Kyoto
Japanese footballers
Association football goalkeepers
Liga 1 (Indonesia) players
Hong Kong First Division League players
Chester City F.C. players
Drogheda United F.C. players
FSV Oggersheim players
Heidelberg United FC players
Hong Kong Rangers FC players
Citizen AA players
Persitara Jakarta Utara players
TSW Pegasus FC players
Japanese expatriate footballers
Japanese expatriate sportspeople in England
Expatriate footballers in England
Japanese expatriate sportspeople in Ireland
Expatriate association footballers in the Republic of Ireland
Japanese expatriate sportspeople in Norway
Expatriate footballers in Norway
Japanese expatriate sportspeople in Germany
Expatriate footballers in Germany
Japanese expatriate sportspeople in Australia
Expatriate soccer players in Australia
Japanese expatriate sportspeople in Hong Kong
Expatriate footballers in Hong Kong
Japanese expatriate sportspeople in Indonesia
Expatriate footballers in Indonesia